John N. Reynolds is the author of 'Ethics in Investments Banking' and 'Sharing Profits'. He has been described in the media variously as 'God's stockbroker', a 'world class investment banker' and 'highly intelligent but aggressive'. His 20 year career in investment banking covered equity research, mergers & acquisitions, financial restructuring and principal investment. He was a top rated equity analyst, led ground-breaking multi-billion dollar acquisitions, and successfully originated high-return investment strategies. Prior to becoming an investment banker John studied theology at Cambridge University. From 2006 to 2011 he chaired the Church of England Ethical Investment Advisory Group, which advises the Church's major investment bodies on ethical and governance issues in their global investment portfolio. He is currently a director of the Central Finance Board of the Methodist Church and a member of the Scottish Episcopal Church investment committee, as well as being a director of a number of companies.

Reynolds is a Fellow of the Institution of Engineering and Technology, and is a former member of the Water Industry Commission for Scotland. He is now the CEO Castle Water.

John received an OBE in 2012 for his services to Save the Children.

References

External links

 https://www.theguardian.com/business/2008/sep/28/economics.banking 
 https://utilityweek.co.uk/interview-john-reynolds-chief-executive-castle-water/

English chief executives
English investment bankers
English philanthropists
English writers
Living people
Officers of the Order of the British Empire
Year of birth missing (living people)